This is a list of rivers in the Republic of the Congo. This list is arranged by Drainage basin, with respective tributaries indented under each larger stream's name.

Atlantic Ocean

Ogooué River
Ngounie River
Ivindo River
Djadie River
Djoua River
Aïna River
Letili River
Nyanga River
Kouilou-Niari River
Louésse River
Chiloango River
Congo River
Djoué River
Lefini River
Nkéni River
Alima River
Lékéti River
Likouala-Mossaka
Kouyou River
Lengoué River
Mambili River
Sangha River
Dja River (Ngoko River)
Likouala-aux-Herbes
Ubangi River
Motaba River
Ibenga River

References

United Nations 2004
 GEOnet Names Server

Congo, Republic of the
Rivers